Donald Ross MacKenzie (December 30, 1874 – November 12, 1925) was a Canadian rower who competed in the 1904 Summer Olympics.

In 1904, he was a member of Canadian boat, which won the silver medal in the men's eight.

References

External links
Donald MacKenzie's profile at databaseOlympics

1874 births
1925 deaths
Canadian male rowers
Medalists at the 1904 Summer Olympics
Olympic medalists in rowing
Olympic rowers of Canada
Olympic silver medalists for Canada
Rowers at the 1904 Summer Olympics
Rowers from Toronto